The constant political turmoil that Bolivia has experienced throughout its history has slowed the development of Bolivian literature. Many talents have had to emigrate or were silenced by the internal conflict. In recent years the literature of Bolivia has been in a process of growth, with the appearance of new writers. Older writers such as Adela Zamudio, Oscar Alfaro, and Franz Tamayo continue to be important.

Nearly half of Bolivia's population speaks indigenous languages such as Quechua, Aymara or Guarani. The indigenous peoples of Bolivia have a rich oral tradition, as expressed in myths, legends, and stories; these stories generally have not been transcribed in writing.

Notable writers
Notable Bolivian writers include:

Bibliography
Elizabeth Monasterios: "Chapter 42 La Paz- Chukiyawu Marka" in: Literary Cultures of Latin America. A comparative History, ed. by Mario  J. Valdés and Djelal Kadir, Volume II:  Institutional Modes and Cultural Modalities, Oxford: Oxford University Press, 2004, pp. 474–497

References

External links

 
Latin American literature by country
South American literature
Spanish-language literature